Annabelle: Creation is a 2017 American supernatural horror film directed by David F. Sandberg, written by Gary Dauberman and produced by Peter Safran and James Wan. It is a prequel to 2014's Annabelle and the fourth installment in The Conjuring Universe franchise. The film stars Stephanie Sigman, Talitha Bateman, Anthony LaPaglia, and Miranda Otto, and depicts the possessed Annabelle doll's origin.

In October 2015, it was confirmed that an Annabelle sequel was in development; it was later revealed that the film would be a prequel rather than a sequel. Lights Out director David F. Sandberg replaced John R. Leonetti as director, with Dauberman returning to write the script and Safran and Wan returning to produce. Principal photography began on June 27, 2016, in Los Angeles, California, and concluded on August 15, 2016.

Annabelle: Creation premiered at the LA Film Festival on June 19, 2017, and was theatrically released in the United States on August 11, 2017. The film grossed over $306million worldwide and received generally positive reviews from critics, who noted it as an improvement over its predecessor. A sequel, Annabelle Comes Home, was released on June 26, 2019.

Plot
A dollmaker named Samuel Mullins and his wife Esther grieve for the loss of their seven-year-old daughter Annabelle, nicknamed "Bee", who dies when she accidentally steps in front of a car.

Twelve years later, the Mullins open their home to provide shelter for Sister Charlotte and six girls left homeless by the closing of their orphanage. Despite having been warned to avoid Bee's locked bedroom, Janice, a young orphan disabled by polio, discovers a note saying "Find me" and sneaks into the room, which has mysteriously become unlocked. She finds a key for Bee's closet and opens it, where she sees an eerie porcelain doll. This unwittingly releases a powerful demon that begins to terrorize the girls.

One night, the demon, taking Bee's form, appears to Janice, saying that it wants her soul. Although she attempts to get away using a stairlift, the demon recalls the stairlift and hurls her violently down to the ground floor, leaving her severely injured and confined to a wheelchair. Janice's best friend Linda is tormented by the demon. One morning, the demon, posing as Sister Charlotte, wheels Janice into the old barn, where, in the form of Bee, it attacks and possesses her after throwing up black bile directly into Janice's mouth. Linda notices changes in Janice's behavior and tells Samuel that Janice snuck into Bee's room and found the doll. Samuel trusts Linda. Janice, who can now walk, transforms into the demon and brutally kills Samuel who follows her while holding a crucifix, forcing him to drop it after moving his fingers backwards one by one. Outside, Sister Charlotte hears his screams and is horrified to find him dead on the floor.

Linda takes Janice's doll and throws it into the well. A strange noise comes from the well and she is almost dragged into it, but Sister Charlotte saves her. Alarmed, Sister Charlotte speaks with the disfigured Esther, who is confined to her bedroom. Esther explains that after Bee's death, they prayed to whatever entity would grant their wish to see their daughter again. An unknown entity answered their prayer and though they briefly saw Bee's spirit, the entity convinced them to transfer its essence into one of Samuel's crafted dolls. They happily agreed but soon realized they had attracted a demon looking for a human host. One night, Esther saw Bee's spirit transforming into the demon, which then gouged out her eye and resulted in her wearing a half doll-like mask to conceal her injury and the scars. Enlisting the help of priests to bless the house, they locked the doll in Bee's closet. Esther and Samuel opened their house as a shelter for orphan children to repent for their actions, but Esther now regrets it since this has provided an opportunity for the demon to look for a human host.

The demon murders Esther and attacks Sister Charlotte. The orphans leave the house, but Linda is trapped and hides in Bee's room as the possessed Janice tries to stab her. Sister Charlotte locks Janice and the doll inside the closet. The next day, police arrive to search the house and find only the doll, which they remove as evidence. Sister Charlotte, Linda, and the orphans are escorted away by officers to find another new home for the orphans, while Janice escapes through a hole in the closet wall and relocates to an orphanage in Santa Monica. Still possessed, she becomes reclusive and calls herself Annabelle. Pete and Sharon Higgins soon adopt Annabelle.

Twelve years later, after being involved in devil worship, a grown-up Annabelle returns home and murders her adoptive parents,  awakening Mia, who warns John about Sharon Higgins' screams.

Cast

 Stephanie Sigman as Sister Charlotte
 Talitha Bateman as Janice
 Tree O'Toole as grown-up Janice / Annabelle Higgins
 Anthony LaPaglia as Samuel Mullins
 Miranda Otto as Esther Mullins
 Lulu Wilson as Linda
 Grace Fulton as Carol
 Philippa Coulthard as Nancy
 Samara Lee as Annabelle "Bee" Mullins
 Tayler Buck as Kate
 Lou Lou Safran as Tierney
 Mark Bramhall as Father Massey
 Adam Bartley as Officer Fuller
 Lotta Losten as the adoption agent 
 Joseph Bishara as the Annabelle Demon
 Fred Tatasciore as the voice of the Annabelle Demon
 Brian Howe as Pete Higgins
 Kerry O'Malley as Sharon Higgins

Additionally, Annabelle Wallis and Ward Horton appear in archive footage from Annabelle as Mia and John Form, respectively, and Bonnie Aarons reprises her role from The Conjuring 2 as the demon nun Valak in an uncredited appearance.

Production

Development
In October 2015, it was confirmed that an Annabelle sequel was in development. David F. Sandberg replaced Annabelles John R. Leonetti as the sequel's director in March 2016. He has described himself as a fan of the franchise, especially the first one, since they were "more of a classic, old-school horror movie in many ways." James Wan and New Line Cinema approached Sandberg to helm the sequel during the post-production on Lights Out, after they were impressed by the early cuts of the film. Sandberg and Wan had met each other during production of Lights Out, as the movie was produced by Wan's Atomic Monster Productions. Sandberg did not want to direct another formulaic horror sequel, but after reading the script and realising how it deviated from the first film, he agreed to direct it. He was attracted to it as it was a standalone film, as a result of which he had more creative freedom. The fact that it was a period piece made it more appealing to him. The first film's screenwriter, Gary Dauberman, returned to write the script, with Peter Safran and James Wan returning to produce. In March 2017, Sandberg revealed the film would be a prequel to the original Annabelle film, and titled Annabelle: Creation.

Sandberg drew references from the look of the 1963 psychological horror film The Haunting, due to its use of CinemaScope cinematography, and cited the score of The Shining to be the biggest inspiration for the film's chilling music. He also borrowed inspiration from the "old school" feel of The Conjuring. He decided he would rely upon tension and suspense, as opposed to jump scares. Unlike his debut film Lights Out, in which he meticulously crafted each scene beforehand, Sandberg had a different approach to Annabelle: Creation. With Annabelle he "was inspired by the set and moment" and so did not prepare with extensive storyboards or diagrams, instead relying on the mantra, "We'll figure it out on set together. We'll make it work."

Sandberg softened some of Annabelle's features to make her more believable as a child's toy, having the cheeks filled-out and fixing her overbite. He found shooting with the doll challenging since the object was immobile, and he needed to use other objects—such as a sheet—to make her move around. Father Robert was a consultant on the film.

Casting

In June 2016, Talitha Bateman, Miranda Otto, and Stephanie Sigman were cast to star in the film. Bateman and fellow child actresses Lulu Wilson and Samara Lee had all seen The Exorcist, and Samara was named after Samara Morgan from The Ring, so despite working on a horror movie, none of the young actresses were disturbed by the film's subject, although some of them did state that they were unsettled by the doll. They said that they did not feel tension or fear throughout production, and Sandberg remarked that the only challenge in working with them was restrictions in terms of hours on the set—such as they cannot work after midnight and work overtime—since they were under age. Bateman was one of the actresses that James Wan had considered for the role of Janet in The Conjuring 2. However, the part eventually went to Madison Wolfe. Since the script demanded a group of children, they brought Bateman in to audition, having been impressed by her screen tests previously. Her brother, Gabriel Bateman, starred in Sandberg's Lights Out. Wilson auditioned for the role of Linda because she wanted to play a horror protagonist, having played an antagonist in Ouija: Origin of Evil. Creation marks her third time starring in a horror film, following Deliver Us from Evil and Ouija.

Anthony LaPaglia agreed to star in the film after his 14-year-old daughter overheard him talking on the phone about the movie, and responded enthusiastically to her father taking the role. He has described his character as "a mysterious, quiet-yet-gruff man who is mourning both the loss of his daughter and the medical degeneration of his wife. The young orphans who move into the now-dilapidated house fear him." To get into character, he did not mingle with the young actresses very much on set. He would intentionally distance himself from them so that during filming they would naturally not like him very much.

Filming
Principal photography began on June 27, 2016, in Los Angeles, California, at the Warner Bros. Studios, Burbank lot, and concluded on August 15, 2016. The film received California film and television tax credits in the amount of $2.4million after spending $17.4million in the state. Sandberg decided to use Steadicam and tracking shots, because of the film's period setting, and he wanted to maintain the "old school" feel of the first two The Conjuring films. According to Sandberg, he does not believe in ghosts or demonic entities, saying, "I haven't experienced anything in life that would lead me to believe they exist". Sandberg reported that actress Stephanie Sigman, who played Sister Charlotte, was "a little bit freaked out by that doll" and, after hearing that a priest had blessed the set of The Conjuring 2, requested the same ritual be performed for this film.

Contest

My Annabelle Creation
In July 2017, Warner Bros. Pictures, in conjunction with James Wan, announced the "My Annabelle Creation" competition as promotion for the then-upcoming film Annabelle: Creation. Participants of the competition were to shoot a short film which would "feel like (it) could exist within the established Conjuring world", with the winning films' directors winning a trip to Los Angeles to meet with David F. Sandberg, the director of Annabelle: Creation, and a New Line Cinema's executive. The entry deadline was July 27, 2017, with five separate competition winners being selected from the United States, the United Kingdom, Mexico, Sweden and Colombia.

The Nurse (2017)

The winner from the United States competition was Julian Terry for his short film The Nurse. Just under 2 minutes in length and filmed over four days, the film revolves around a bandaged and temporarily blind girl named Emily (Aria Walters) who attempts to elude the eponymous Demon Nurse (Hannah Palazzi).

The Confession (2017)
The winner from the United Kingdom competition was Liam Banks for his short film The Confession. Just over 2 minutes in length and filmed over one week, the film revolves around a psychologically-damaged young woman (Esmee Matthews), who after witnessing the deaths of her friends (Charlie Clarke and Jess Messenger), confides in a priest (Earnest Vernon) regarding her terrifying encounters with supernatural entities, only to realize she never escaped.

What's Wrong With Mom? (2017)
The winner from the Mexico competition was Raùl Bribiesca for his short film What's Wrong With Mom?. Exactly 2 minutes in length and filmed in a single take, the film revolves around a father (Fabián Hurtado) and daughter (Carina Pámenes) as they're praying to God to exorcise the mother (Perla Corona) of the "Marifer", a teleporting demon possessing her.

Blund's Lullaby (2017)
The winner from the Sweden competition was Amanda Nilsson and Magda Lindblom for their short film Blund's Lullaby. Just over 2 minutes in length, the film was inspired by the nordic version of the Sandman, known as John Blund.

Innocent Souls (2017)
The winner from the Colombia competition was Alejandro López for his short film (Spanish: Almas Inocentes).

Music
On November 23, 2016, Benjamin Wallfisch was hired to compose the music for the film. WaterTower Music released the soundtrack album on August 4, 2017.

Release
The film was originally set for release on May 19, 2017, but was pushed back to August 11, 2017, to avoid competition with Alien: Covenant. The film premiered at the Los Angeles Film Festival on June 19, 2017.

Home media
The film was released on Digital HD on October 17, 2017, and on Blu-ray and DVD on October 24, 2017. It was included in a May 2022 Blu-ray collection along with other The Conjuring Universe movies.

Reception

Box office
Annabelle: Creation grossed $102.1million in the United States and Canada and $204.4million in other territories, for a worldwide total of $306.5million, against a production budget of $15million. With its release, it pushed The Conjuring franchise past the $1billion threshold, making it only the third horror series to cross that mark, after the Alien franchise and Resident Evil series. Deadline Hollywood calculated the film made a net profit of $108.7million, when factoring together all expenses and revenues.

In North America, the film was released alongside The Nut Job 2: Nutty by Nature and The Glass Castle, and was projected to gross around $30million from 3,502 theaters in its opening weekend. The film grossed $4million from its Thursday night previews, the highest of The Conjuring series and double the original Annabelles $2.1million. It went on to open to $35million. In its second weekend, the film dropped 55.7% to earn another $15.5million, which was a smaller second-weekend drop than Annabelle (57%) and The Conjuring 2 (63%), and the best second-weekend hold of the franchise since the initial Conjuring film (46%).

Outside North America, the film was released to positive reception from international audiences, which is reflected in its box office performance. It broke several opening records for the horror genre as well as for the studio and came in ahead of The Conjuring and Annabelle in many markets. The week prior to its domestic release, the film debuted in Italy at number one, with $1.1million. It earned $35.4million on its opening weekend from 39 markets, almost on par with its domestic debut and marking the second-biggest international opening in the franchise, behind only The Conjuring 2. Overall, the film was number two at the international box office after Wolf Warrior 2. The film expanded to 56 markets in its sophomore weekend, adding a handful of major markets and thereby topping the worldwide chart for the first time with an estimated $42million.

It recorded the highest opening weekend in the franchise in 26 markets and the biggest launch for a horror film of all time in Sweden, Poland, Portugal, India, Malaysia ($2.2million), the UAE ($1.1million) and Vietnam. The top openings came from Mexico ($8million), Korea ($6.7million), and India ($9.8million). In South Korea, the film grossed $1.2million from Thursday previews. Despite its South Korean release falling during diplomatic tensions, it ultimately opened there with $6.7million, as the number-one foreign release and the third-highest-grossing movie overall behind local films A Taxi Driver and Midnight Runners.

Critical response
On review aggregator website Rotten Tomatoes, the film has an approval rating of 70% based on 193 reviews, with an average rating of 6.2/10. The website's critical consensus reads, "Annabelle: Creation adds another strong chapter to the Conjuring franchise—and offers further proof that freaky-looking dolls remain reliably terrifying." Metacritic, another review aggregator, assigned the film a weighted average score of 62 out of 100, based on 29 critics, indicating "generally favorable reviews". Audiences polled by CinemaScore gave the film an average grade of B on an A+ to F scale, the same score earned by the first Annabelle film, while those at PostTrak gave it an average 4 out of 5 stars and a 56% "definite recommend".

Justin Lowe of The Hollywood Reporter called it "wickedly terrifying," and said it was "closer in tone and old-school psychological fright tactics to the original film than either The Conjuring 2 or Annabelle." Peter Debruge of Variety, while criticising the plot, said the film nevertheless "manages to conjure some effective scares," and that "this effective yet empty-headed horror movie goes to show how eager audiences are to be scared, and how even an unsightly doll can do the trick when the spirit is willing." Similarly, Chris Hewitt of Empire felt that while the "movie can't hold a flickering candle to the James Wan–directed entries in the series... it's got plenty of decent shocks, and the odd genuine surprise, up its sleeve". However, Emily Yoshida of Vulture wrote that "Annabelle: Creations countless sequences of foreboding silence—hands reaching for doorknobs, our heroines shuddering in the dark, waiting for their demonic tormentor to attack—offer nothing to really latch on to, no larger reason to care that's not purely technical". Chris Nashawaty of Entertainment Weekly gave the film a "C" grade, calling it "a mishmash of clichés and nonsense" and writing that "none of this will seem new to horror fans".

Accolades

Sequel

In April 2018, Warner Bros. announced July 3, 2019, as the release date for an untitled new film in The Conjuring franchise. Later that month, it was announced that the film would be a third Annabelle film, with Gary Dauberman signed on to write and direct, in his directorial debut. James Wan and Peter Safran co-produced the project. In May 2019, the film's release date was changed to June 26, 2019.

Notes

References

External links
 
 
 
 

2017 films
2017 horror films
2017 horror thriller films
2010s supernatural horror films
American horror thriller films
American supernatural horror films
American mystery horror films
Demons in film
American horror drama films
2010s mystery horror films
Dune Entertainment films
Films about child death
Films about spirit possession
Film spin-offs
Films directed by David F. Sandberg
Films produced by James Wan
Films produced by Peter Safran
Films scored by Benjamin Wallfisch
Films shot in Los Angeles
Films set in 1943
Films set in 1955
Films set in 1967
Films about Satanism
Films about haunted dolls
New Line Cinema films
Films with screenplays by Gary Dauberman
Films about sentient toys
Religious horror films
The Conjuring Universe
2010s English-language films
Warner Bros. films
Horror films about toys
2010s American films
American prequel films